Teriitaria or Teri'itaria or Teri'itari'a may refer to:

Teriitaria I (1769–1793), king of Huahine from 1790 to 1793
Teriitaria II (1790–1858), queen of Huahine from 1815 to 1852
Teriitaria, personal name of Pōmare III (1820–1827)
Teriitaria, personal name of Pōmare V (1839–1891)